Campbell Award  may refer to:

John W. Campbell Memorial Award for Best Science Fiction Novel
Astounding Award for Best New Writer, formerly the John W. Campbell Award for Best New Writer
Robert W. Campbell Award, given by the National Safety Council
Donald T. Campbell Award, given by the Society for Personality and Social Psychology

See also
 Campbell Trophy (disambiguation)